The divisions of Bangladesh are divided into 64 districts or zila. The headquarters of a district is called a district seat (jela shodor). The districts are further subdivided into 495 subdistricts  or upazila.

History

Before independence, Bangladesh (then known as East Pakistan) had 19 districts.

English spelling change 
In April 2018, the government changed the English spelling of five districts to avoid inconsistencies in the Bengali and English spellings. The spellings have been changed from Bogra to Bogura, Barisal to Barishal, Jessore to Jashore, Chittagong to Chattogram and Comilla to Cumilla.

Administration

Deputy commissioner
A deputy commissioner (popularly abbreviated to "DC") is the executive head of the district. Deputy commissioners are appointed by the government from the deputy secretary BCS Administration Cadre.

District councils

A district council (or zila parishad) is a local government body at the district level. The Bengali word parishad means council and zila parishad translates to district council.

The functions of a district council include construction and maintenance of roads, and bridges, building hospitals and dispensaries, schools and educational institutions, health facilities and sanitation, tube wells for drinking water, rest houses, and coordination of activities of the Union parishads within the district.

Timeline of creation
 1666

 Chattogram district.

 1772
 Rangpur District.

 Rajshahi District.

 Dhaka District.

 1781

 Jashore District.

 3 January 1782

 Sylhet District.

 1786

 Dinajpur District.

 1787

 Mymensingh District.

 1790

 Cumilla District.

 1797

 Bakerganj District( Now Barishal District).

 1815

 Faridpur District.

 1821

 Noakhali District.
 Bogura district.

 1832

 Pabna District.

 1860

 Hill Tracts district is split from Chattogram district.

 1882

 Khulna District is split from Jashore district .

 1947

 Kushtia District is established Because of the Partition of Bengal in 1947 before that it is a part of Nadia District.

 1969

 Tangail District is split from Mymensingh district.
 Patuakhali district is split from Barishal district.

 1971

 Dhaka Division: Dhaka district, Faridpur district, Mymensingh district, Tangail district
 Chattogram Division: Hill Tracts district, Chattogram district, Cumilla district, Noakhali district, Sylhet district.
 Rajshahi Division: Bogura district, Dinajpur district, Rajshahi district, Rangpur district, Pabna district.
 Khulna Division: Barisal district, Jashore district, Khulna district, Kushtia district, Patuakhali district

 1978

 Jamalpur District is split from Mymensingh district.

 1983

 Joypurhat District was split from Bogura district.

 1984

22 February 

 Magura district was split from Jashore district.
 Brahmanbaria and Chandpur districts were split from Cumilla district.
 Sirajganj district was split from Pabna district.
 Sherpur district was split from Jamalpur district.  
 Netrokona and Kishoreganj districts were split from Mymensingh district.
 Lakshmipur and Feni districts were split from Noakhali district.
 Sunamganj, Habiganj and Maulvibazar districts were split from Sylhet district.
 Thakurgaon and Panchagarh districts were split from Dinajpur district.

 1 March 

 Jhenaidah and Narail split from Jashore district. 
 Cox's Bazar district was split from Chattogram district. 
 Satkhira and Bagerhat districts were split from Khulna District.
 Meherpur and Chuadanga districts were split from Kustia District. 
 Prirojpur, Bhola and  Barguna were spilt from Barishal district.

List of districts

See also 
 Divisions of Bangladesh
 Upazilas of Bangladesh
 Villages of Bangladesh

References

 
Subdivisions of Bangladesh
Districts
Bangladesh 2
Districts, Bangladesh
Bangladesh geography-related lists